This is the results breakdown of the local elections held in the Valencian Community on 25 May 2003. The following tables show detailed results in the autonomous community's most populous municipalities, sorted alphabetically.

Overall

City control
The following table lists party control in the most populous municipalities, including provincial capitals (shown in bold). Gains for a party are displayed with the cell's background shaded in that party's colour.

Municipalities

Alcoy
Population: 60,465

Alicante
Population: 293,629

Benidorm
Population: 61,352

Castellón de la Plana
Population: 153,225

Elche
Population: 201,731

Elda
Population: 53,103

Gandia
Population: 62,280

Orihuela
Population: 61,018

Paterna
Population: 48,367

Sagunto
Population: 57,741

Torrent
Population: 67,393

Torrevieja
Population: 69,763

Valencia

Population: 761,871

See also
2003 Valencian regional election

References

Valencian Community
2003